Stavros Xarchakos, Greek: Σταύρος Ξαρχάκος  (born 14 March 1939) is a Greek composer and conductor.

Biography
Stavros Xarchakos was born in Athens, where he studied at the Athens Conservatoire. He has family origins from the Mani Peninsula. He emerged in the Greek music scene around 1963, composing music for the theatre and cinema. Among his collaborators was lyricist Lefteris Papadopoulos and singer Nikos Xylouris.

In 1967 he went to Paris to study with Nadia Boulanger. He stayed in Paris for four years, and then studied with David Diamond at the Juilliard School of Music in New York. He served as director of the National Orchestra of Greek Music.

He was later involved in politics and was elected Member of the Greek Parliament twice, before becoming a Member of the European Parliament (MEP) from 2000 to 2004. He was again a candidate for the European Parliament with New Democracy, in the elections of 25 May 2014, but was not elected.

Music
While he mainly composed in the style of Greek popular music, Laïka, Xarchakos also composed in the classical music genre.

His music has been recorded to 42 albums, has been used in 21 movies and for 15 TV productions. Internationally he is known as the composer for the Rembetiko film score, composing the music for the Werner Herzog film Signs Of Life, and composing the music for the 1983 BBC TV mini series, The Dark Side of the Sun.

External links
 
 

1939 births
20th-century classical composers
20th-century male musicians
Greek classical musicians
Greek film score composers
Living people
Male film score composers
MEPs for Greece 1999–2004
Musicians from Athens
20th-century Greek musicians
New Democracy (Greece) MEPs